St Mary Magdalene, Bailgate, is a Grade II listed parish church in Lincoln, England. It is dedicated to Jesus' companion, Mary Magdalene.

History
The church stands in the Exchequer near the site of a Saxon church, St Mary's, (which is believed to be under the present cathedral building) mentioned in the Domesday book. The current building dates from the late twelfth/early thirteenth century, was opened in 1317 and was rebuilt in 1695, following damage by the Parliamentary forces in 1644. In 1882 George Frederick Bodley undertook some remodelling work including a chancel screen and organ case.

Incumbents

VICAR
 ? Geoffrey de Whicham - Chaplain
1250 Godred -  [previously chaplain]

RECTOR
1275 John de North Leverton
1293 William de Blighburgh
1305 William de Harpeswelle [capalanus]
John de Bolun alias Bohun
1322 Richard de Hilletoft
1340 Ranulfus de Harrington
John Branspath (qui obit 1376)
John de Searle
1384 Walter de de Windesore
1403 Robert de Hoggesthorpe
1406 William Skaytt
1422 Robert Gylman
1453 John Walpole
1456 William Kirksgarth
1461 John Sharpe
1468 John Waltham
1484 William Skelton
1492 Henry Farley
1520 Thomas Willson
1522 Nicholas Bayte
1527 John Cook, Walter Ireland, Robert Kelsey
1529 Christopher Massinberd
1552 Bartholemew Warde
1558 Robert Taylor
1560 Edward Parker
1564 Richard Halliwell
1565 Willian Mann
1570 Jeremias Loveday
1583 Christopher Diggles
1608 Peter Walter
1623 John Crispe
1665 Walter Powell
1712 Anthony Reid (qui obit 1714)
1714 Johannes Crisp
1721 Nathan Drake (qui obit 1752)
1753 Thomas Sympson (qui obit 1786)
1792 George Jepson
1797 William Gray
1826 S.Martin
1829 Richard Garvey, Senior
1862 Henry Woollaston Hutton
1876 William Barber Lightfoot
1878 Peter Llewellyn
1880 George Tyson Harvey
1894 William Neville Usher
1901 Henry Leigh Bennett
1904 Arthur Roland Maddison
1907 Cecil Edward Bolam
1926 Charles Harold Scott
1940 Euclid Curry Butterworth
1945 Cyril Theodore Henry Dams
1952 Hugh Frank Riches
1967 David Nigel Griffiths
1973 Victor Read (Priest-in-Charge: S.Mary Magdalene w. St Paul-in-the-Bail)
1973 John Benson Bayley (1973-75 Priest-in-Charge: S.Mary Magdalene w. St Paul-in-the-Bail. 1975:The Benefice of Lincoln Minster Group is created. 1975 Rector: Lincoln Minster Group)
2003 Edward Michael Crispin Bowes-Smith (Priest-in-Charge) (2012 The Benefice of Lincoln Minster Group is dissolved)

VICAR
2014 Matthew Alexander Whitehead
2018 Adrian Paul Smith

Organ

In 1864 a Lieblich organ was installed by T. C. Lewis. In 1866 a new instrument was installed by T. H.Nicholson of Lincoln, rebuilt in 1914 by Henry Jackson of Lincoln and in 1945 by Cousans of Lincoln. Details of the organ can be found on the National Pipe Organ Register.

Organists

1855 L. Mawer
1855 Miss Carlill
1856 Mrs Mawer
c.1858 Allen
 1858 B.Wray (died in office) 
c.1860 J.Wilson
1870 William Lawrence (also junior assistant organist at cathedral)
1880 Ernest Wood
1883 Frank George
1920 John Rayner
1947 Dennis Townhill (also pupil-assistant organist at cathedral)
1949 Denys Talbot
1954 Peter Rushton
1957 Oswald Lintern
1992 Christopher Brook

References

Lincoln
Lincoln
Churches in Lincoln, England
Lincoln